FlatWorld is a publisher of college-level textbooks and educational supplements for a worldwide audience founded in 2007 as Flat World Knowledge by Eric Frank and Jeff Shelstad. It was acquired at the end of 2016 by Alastair Adam and John Eielson and its company headquarters was moved from Washington, DC, to Boston, Massachusetts. Following this acquisition, the company rebranded as FlatWorld.



Company history
In 2007, Flat World Knowledge was founded by Jeff Shelstad and Eric Frank in Nyack, New York. By August 2009, Flat World textbooks had been adopted at 400 colleges for use by 40,000 students. In 2010, Flat World Knowledge moved from Nyack, New York to Irvington, New York. That year, Flat World Knowledge claimed that they would save 150,000 college students $12 million in textbook costs in the 2010–2011 school year after adoptions by more than 1,300 educators as of August 2010.

FlatWorld secured $11.5 million in investments through 2010, including an initial $700k angel investment. 

In January 2011, $15 million in Series B funding led by Bertelsmann Digital Media Investments (BDMI), a wholly owned subsidiary of Bertelsmann AG, and Bessemer Venture Partners was announced. Returning investors for Series B funding include Valhalla Partners, GSA Venture Partners (formerly Greenhill SAVP), Primary Venture Partners and several angel investors. Random House also announced an investment in Flat World Knowledge in April, 2011.

The company originally offered every textbook published free using online delivery under the open content paradigm, but in November 2012, the company announced that it would no longer offer free access to textbooks. 

In late 2016, Flat World Knowledge was acquired by Alastair Adam and John Eielson and rebranded as FlatWorld.

Accessibility and regulatory issues
Flat World Knowledge textbooks have been developed for accessible publishing. Flat World Knowledge partnered with Bookshare to provide books using an electronic Braille format. Flat World was the first postsecondary textbook publisher to recognize and alleviate this problem.

Sustainability
Digital textbook and course material formats offer sustainability advantages over traditional paper textbooks. According to a publishing industry study, an estimated "net [carbon] emission of 8.85 pounds per book [is created for each paper book] sold to consumers."  In 2010–2011, approximately 57.5% of students using FlatWorld texts opted for entirely digital delivery. As of fall 2011, 70% of students opt for digital formats, significantly reducing the ecologic footprint from textbook use when compared to the historic paper textbook format.

See also
 OpenCourseWare
 Open educational resources
 OpenStax College
 Open textbook
 Bookboon
 China Open Resources for Education
 Connexions
 Curriki
 Flexbook
 Free High School Science Texts South Africa
 Khan Academy
 Open.Michigan
 Tufts OpenCourseWare
 Wikibooks

References

External links
 Digital Textbook Sales in U.S. Higher Education — A Five-Year Projection by Rob Reynolds. ("Factors within the Publishing and Education Markets Affecting the Sales of Digital Textbooks" section and trend charts) Explana. 2010.
 "A Cover to Cover Solution: How Open Textbooks are the Path to Textbook Affordability." Original research report by Nicole Allen of The Student PIRGs.
 Creative Commons Talks With Student PIRGs’ Nicole Allen: "Open Education and Policy." October 14, 2010.
 "Get Rid of Print and Go Digital" by Anya Kamenetz in the New York Times. August 16, 2010.

Book publishing companies based in New York (state)
Textbook publishing companies
Open content
Academic publishing companies
Publishing companies of the United States
Electronic publishing
Creative Commons-licensed works
Publishing companies established in 2007
American companies established in 2007
2007 establishments in New York (state)
Open educational resources
Open access publishers